Raymond Sharkey Jr. (November 14, 1952 – June 11, 1993) was an American stage, film and television actor. His most notable film role was Vincent Vacarri in the 1980 film The Idolmaker, for which he won the Golden Globe Award for Best Actor – Motion Picture Musical or Comedy. He is also known for his role as Sonny Steelgrave in the television series Wiseguy.

Early life
Sharkey was born in Brooklyn to Cecelia and Ray Sharkey, Sr. He was of Irish and Italian descent. Sharkey's father was a professional drummer who abandoned the family when Sharkey was five years old. He was raised by his mother, Cecelia, in Brooklyn's Red Hook neighborhood. Sharkey became interested in acting after seeing Jack Lemmon in the 1962 film Days of Wine and Roses. After attending New York City Community College for one year, he enrolled at the HB Studio to study acting. While attending the HB Studio, Sharkey performed in various Off-Broadway stage productions. In 1973, he and his friend, boxer/actor Chu Chu Malave, moved to Los Angeles to pursue acting careers.

Career
In 1974, he made his film debut in The Lords of Flatbush. Sharkey went on to appear in more than forty motion pictures and dozens of guest appearances on various television series.

An early standout performance in a character role came in Who'll Stop the Rain (1978), directed by Karel Reisz. The film's editor, John Bloom, said, "I do not believe there’s ever been a better pair of villains than Richard Masur and Ray Sharkey — funny and terrifying in equal measure." This echoed a contemporary review, which called them "psychopaths played to the hilt" and added, "They're a great team. Whether they are supposed to be so funny, even when they are shouting obscenities, only the director knows. But funny they are."

In 1980, Sharkey portrayed rock promoter Vinnie Vacarri in The Idolmaker. The role boosted Sharkey's career and earned him a Golden Globe Award for his performance in the film. The following year, he was nominated for another Golden Globe for his role in The Ordeal of Bill Carney, in which he played the title role. Shortly after appearing in The Idolmaker, Sharkey developed a $400 a day heroin habit. As a result of his drug use, his career declined and he was relegated to mainly supporting roles. He overdosed several times and was involved in four drug-related car accidents, two of which required him to undergo microsurgery on his eyes. He tried undergoing rehab treatment several times but would ultimately relapse a few months later. In 1987, Sharkey spent two months in an Orange County rehab center in an effort to kick his drug and alcohol addiction for good.

Four days after leaving rehab, he won the role of Sonny Steelgrave in the series Wiseguy. As one reviewer observed, "The Steelgrave episodes were wonderful, partly because of Sharkey's performance as the tough-tender Sonny." Another stated, "Sharkey's portrayal of Steelgrave, with his murderous, mercurial charm, has been likened to James Cagney's Cody Jarrett in White Heat". Producer Stephen J. Cannell and many fans were sorry to see Sharkey's character go, but the format of Wiseguy was self-contained story "arcs" of several episodes. The character proved to be popular with audiences—indeed, many letters came in to ask that he return, prompting speculation about flashback Steelgrave episodes (which never happened). Sharkey was viewed as deserving an Emmy Award nomination but did not receive it. A 2008 Entertainment Weekly retrospective on "The 50 Biggest Emmy Snubs" ranked Sharkey's as #26.

With that career boost, Sharkey then co-starred in the biographical film Wired. Based on the life of John Belushi, Sharkey portrayed a Puerto Rican angel who meets Belushi after his death in the morgue and "show[s] him the error of his ways." Sharkey's next role was in the 1989 black comedy film Scenes from the Class Struggle in Beverly Hills.

In 1991, he starred in the ABC sitcom The Man in the Family. While Sharkey received good reviews for his performance, the show was panned by critics and canceled after one season. The following year, he appeared in a guest spot on Jake and the Fatman, and starred in the television movie In the Line of Duty: Street War. On July 30, 1992, while filming a guest spot on the television series, The Hat Squad, in Vancouver, he was arrested for drug possession. Canadian customs officials, making a routine inspection of incoming cargo at the airport, discovered small amounts of cocaine and heroin in a black envelope being sent from Los Angeles to Sharkey in Vancouver. Police searched his hotel room and found an additional supply of drugs. He was jailed and later released on bail. Sharkey was later fired from The Hat Squad. Sharkey's final role was in the 1993 comedy film Cop and a Half.

Personal life
In May 1981, Sharkey married model Rebecca Wood. The marriage ended in 1986 due to Sharkey's drug abuse. In 1988, he married actress Carole Graham. That marriage produced one daughter, Cecelia, in 1989.  In November 1992, Graham divorced Sharkey, also citing his drug abuse as the reason for the divorce.

On September 22, 2015, Sharkey's daughter, Cecelia Bonnie Sharkey, was charged with capital murder for the death of her boyfriend's mother, Patricia Metropoulous (Hickerson). In November 2017, she pleaded no contest, was declared insane at the time of the crime and was committed to Patton State Hospital.

Illness and death
Sharkey was diagnosed as HIV positive in the late 1980s. He reportedly contracted the virus through intravenous drug use. After his death, Sharkey's manager Herb Nanas admitted that they both decided to keep his diagnosis a secret, fearing it would hurt his career. Despite his diagnosis, Sharkey remained in denial about his HIV-positive status and, according to his manager, had sex with an estimated 100 women after he was diagnosed.

Sharkey began a relationship with model/actress Elena Monica, daughter of comedian Corbett Monica, in April 1991. She became ill and was hospitalized with aseptic meningitis in July 1991. During a routine check, she tested positive for HIV. Monica believed she contracted the virus from Sharkey, who continued to deny that he had infected her. Monica ended the relationship in October 1991 due to her suspicions. In July 1992, she learned that another woman also suspected that Sharkey had infected her with HIV as well. Later that same year, Monica filed a $52 million lawsuit against the actor for knowingly infecting her with HIV.

In an interview with Details magazine conducted in March 1993, three months before his death, Sharkey told the reporter that he was in fact HIV-positive by saying that he "harbored a strain of HIV" that he believed would never develop into AIDS. When asked about his ex-girlfriend Elena Monica who accused him of infecting her with HIV, Sharkey said, "This disease is funny. One day you're negative and the next day you're positive. And people suffer. I don't think she suffered from me." Monica won her lawsuit against Sharkey by default judgment after his death (Sharkey declined to challenge her suit when it was originally filed), but she received no compensation from his estate because the actor had very little money.
 
Sharkey died of complications from AIDS at Lutheran Medical Center in Brooklyn, New York, on June 11, 1993, at age 40. He is interred in Saint Charles Cemetery in Farmingdale, Long Island, New York.

In June 1993, shortly after Sharkey's death, a Beverly Hills graphic designer who said she had an on-and-off relationship with Sharkey from 1985 to 1991 announced that she was suing Sharkey's estate. The woman, who was only identified as "Joyce", cared for Sharkey in his final months and said that she believed that she also had contracted HIV from Sharkey after she was diagnosed with the virus in April 1992.

Filmography

Awards and nominations

References

External links

1952 births
1993 deaths
Male actors from New York City
AIDS-related deaths in New York (state)
American male film actors
American people of Irish descent
American people of Italian descent
American male stage actors
American male television actors
Best Musical or Comedy Actor Golden Globe (film) winners
Burials at Saint Charles Cemetery
People from Red Hook, Brooklyn
20th-century American male actors
Burials in New York (state)